Monckton-Arundell is a surname. Notable people with the surname include:

George Monckton-Arundell (disambiguation), multiple people
Robert Monckton-Arundell, 4th Viscount Galway (1752–1810), British politician
William Monckton-Arundell, 2nd Viscount Galway (died 1772), British politician

Compound surnames